The 2007 Arab Youth Athletics Championships was the second edition of the international athletics competition for under-18 athletes from Arab countries. Organised by the Arab Athletic Federation, it took place in the Syrian capital of Damascus from 27–29 June. A total of thirty-nine events were contested, of which 20 by male and 19 by female athletes, matching the programme of the 2007 World Youth Championships in Athletics bar the exclusion of a girls' steeplechase event.

Four athletes achieved individual doubles at the tournament. On the boys' side, Saudi athlete Hamada Al-Bishi achieved a novel 100 metres/400 metre hurdles double, Sudan's Awad El Karim Makki took both 200 metres and 400 metres titles, and Ismail Al Saffar of Kuwait took both gold medals in the horizontal jumps. The sole girl to win two individual titles was Souheir Bouali of Algeria, who won both short sprints. She went on to become a senior champion at the 2013 Arab Athletics Championships six years later.

Morocco, which had dominated the inaugural edition in 2004, was absent from the competition. Egypt topped the medal table with eight golds among its haul of 21 medals. Sudan achieved the second highest tally of gold medals with six. The host nation Syria won the most overall medals with 22 and ranked joint-third on gold medals with five – a number also reached by both Algeria and Tunisia. Fourteen nations reached the medal table.

Unlike some of the athletes of the previous edition, no medallists in Damascus reached the podium at the following World Youth Championships. Sudan's sprint champion Makki and boys' discus throw winner Hamid Mansour went on to win medals at the 2009 World Youth Championships, however.

Medal summary

Men

Women

 The girls' hurdles event was only timed to the tenth of a second, rather than the standard hundredths, due to technical limitations.

Medal table

References

Results
Championnats Arabes Des Cadets - Damas 27, 28 et 29-06-2007. Tunis Athletisme. Retrieved on 2015-05-27.

Arab Youth Athletics Championships
Sport in Damascus
Arab Youth Athletics Championships
Arab Youth Athletics Championships
International athletics competitions hosted by Syria
21st century in Damascus
2007 in youth sport